Vector Institute may refer to:
 State Research Center of Virology and Biotechnology VECTOR, a Russian biological research center.
 The Vector Institute, a private artificial intelligence research institute in Toronto.